The 2018 season is JPV Marikina's 2nd season in the top flight of Philippines football.

Pre-season and friendlies

Friendlies

Competitions

Overview

Philippines Football League

Results summary

Note:
 a Three points was deducted for JPV Marikina from the league standing due to the club's failure to comply with Liga Futbol Inc. Disciplinary Committee's Decision No. 010318DC02.

Results by round

Matches

Notes:
 a  Due to the unavailability of Iloilo Sports Complex, the match will be played in Kaya's previous "home" venue University of Makati Stadium.
 b  Due to the unavailability of Marikina Sports Complex, the match will be played in neutral venue Rizal Memorial Stadium or Biñan Football Stadium or PFF National Training Center.
 c  Due to the unavailability of Davao del Norte Sports Complex, the match will be played in Rizal Memorial Stadium.
 d  JPV Marikina FC was not able to mobilize adequate security personnel for the match. As a result, it was played without spectators.
 e  Due to the unavailability of Cebu City Sports Complex, the match will be played in neutral venue Biñan Football Stadium or PFF National Training Centre.
 f  Originally schedule on 11 July but the match was abandoned by Global Cebu. JPV Marikina won 3–0 by default.

Copa Paulino Alcantara

Group stage 

Note:
 a  Due to the unavailability of Marikina Sports Complex, the match will be played in neutral venue PFF National Training Centre.
 b  Due to the unavailability of Iloilo Sports Complex, the match will be played in neutral venue Rizal Memorial Stadium.
 c  Due to the unavailability of Cebu City Sports Complex, the match will be played in neutral venue PFF National Training Centre.

Knockout stage

Squad

League squad

Transfers

Pre-season

In

Out

Mid-season

Out

References

JPV Marikina 2018
JPV Marikina 2018